Manuel Ignacio Guerra Huizar (born September 4, 1993, in Hermosillo, Sonora) is a Mexican professional footballer who plays for Gavilanes de Matamoros on loan from Sonora of Ascenso MX.

References

External links
 

Living people
1993 births
Mexican footballers
Association football midfielders
Cimarrones de Sonora players
Gavilanes de Matamoros footballers
Ascenso MX players
Liga Premier de México players
Tercera División de México players
Footballers from Sonora
Sportspeople from Hermosillo
21st-century Mexican people